The history of the Jews in Guernsey dates back to well before the events of 1940–5. A London Jew named Abraham was described in 1277 as being from "La Gelnseye" (Guernsey). A converted Portuguese Jew, Edward Brampton, was appointed Governor of Guernsey in 1482.

Guernsey's Jewish population has historically been much smaller than that of neighboring Jersey, and there has never been a synagogue on the island.

Background

Guernsey (Guernésiais: Guernési) is an island in the English Channel off the coast of Normandy. It lies roughly north of Saint-Malo and to the west of Jersey and the Cotentin Peninsula. With several smaller nearby islands, it forms a jurisdiction within the Bailiwick of Guernsey, a British Crown dependency. The jurisdiction is made up of ten parishes on the island of Guernsey, three other inhabited islands (Herm, Jethou and Lihou), and many small islets and rocks. The jurisdiction is not part of the United Kingdom, although defence and most foreign relations are handled by the British Government. The entire jurisdiction lies within the Common Travel Area of the British Islands and the Republic of Ireland, and although it is not a member of the European Union, it does have a special relationship with it, being treated as part of the European Community with access to the single market for the purposes of the free trade in goods. Taken together with the separate jurisdictions of Alderney and Sark it forms the Bailiwick of Guernsey. The two Bailiwicks of Guernsey and Jersey together form the geographical grouping known as the Channel Islands.

World War II
Enemy aliens, people born in a country with which Britain was at war, were restricted from entering Britain without a permit. Accordingly, a few Jews became trapped in Guernsey when the islands were occupied. In addition, a few locals decided to remain in Guernsey rather than evacuate in June 1940.

During the occupation of the Channel Islands by Nazi Germany during World War II, laws were imposed on the authorities that required registration. All non Guernsey and British foreigners (aliens) had already been required to register with the police, but the records did not mention their faith. An advertisement appeared in the newspaper in October 1941 calling on all Jews to identify themselves. The Germans issued identity cards to everyone, which listed their nationality and faith.

Jews identified in Guernsey and Sark 
 Elda Brouard née Bauer, 27/4/1884, British by marriage, born Italy 
 Elisabet Duquemin née Fink, 21/7/1899, British by marriage, born Austria
 Auguste Spitz, 28/8/1901, German, born Austria 
 Therese Steiner, 22/4/191625 German, born Austria 
 Anny (Annie) Wranowsky, 22/4/1894, Czech but held German passport, living on Sark

Marianne Grunfeld, born in Poland in 1912, had studied horticulture at the University of Reading before going to work on a farm in Guernsey. She was identified in April 1942 as Jewish. 

Theresia Steiner, an Austrian, non-practising Jew, who had come to the Islands from England and become trapped in the Islands by the invasion as she had been detained as an alien, amongst 30 enemy aliens who were arrested and detained in June 1940. She didn't have a UK visa to go to the UK as required for immigrants from Germany and Austria (from 1938). A qualified dental nurse, she was then employed as a nurse by the States of Guernsey, working at the Castel Hospital, She went, after 18 months to the German authorities to ask to contact her parents. The First Order Against The Jews was 23 October 1940 and this was the beginning of the adoption of the Nuremberg Race Laws in to the Channel Islands’ legal systems. The Islands' bailiffs collaborated with the Germans. Only Sir Abraham Lainé protested against the anti-Jewish laws. The deportation of the Jews from the Channel Islands was with the full connivance of the bailiffs and the government authorities. According to the grandson of Bailiff Carey of Guernsey, Winston Churchill did not know whether to hang William G. Carey or knight him. To hush up the level of collaboration, he was knighted and the history of Guernsey's delivery of the Jews to the Nazis was concealed for decades.

The first group of three Jews were ordered to leave the Island in April 1942. The three, Marianne Grunfeld, Auguste Spitz, and Therese Steiner, were first sent to Saint-Malo, where they took up local employment, Marianne Grunfeld was reported to be living in Laval, France, until three months later when they were rounded up in a mass deportation of French Jews. They were sent directly to Auschwitz, where they all died.

The second group of three, Elda Brouard, Elisabet Duquemin, and Janet Duquemin (18 months old), were sent with Henry Duquemin (husband of Elisabet) in February 1943. Henry was sent to Oflag VII-C in Laufen, Germany, and the two women and baby went first to a prison in Compiègne and then after 6 months to Ilag V-B in Biberach an der Riss. Both of the camps in Laufen and Biberach were civilian camps containing many Channel Island civilians.

Annie Wranowsky lived on Sark throughout the war working as a German language teacher.

Miriam Jay lived in Guernsey throughout the war without being identified.

Sir Geoffrey Rowland, the Bailiff of Guernsey from 2005 to 2012, has stated that the government of Guernsey was powerless to stop the deportations due to the large number of German soldiers on the island.

Current
There are still some Jews living in Guernsey today, some of whom attend the congregation in Jersey. The present-day Channel Islands community, consisting of some 60 Jews was founded in 1962.

See also
History of the Jews in Jersey
History of the Jews in the United Kingdom
List of churches, chapels and meeting halls in the Channel Islands

References

Guernsey
Guernsey
Jews
Jewish
Jewish
Guernsey